Scott Thomas McGough (born October 31, 1989) is an American professional baseball pitcher for the Arizona Diamondbacks of Major League Baseball (MLB). He made his MLB debut with the Miami Marlins in 2015. He also played for the Tokyo Yakult Swallows of Nippon Professional Baseball.

Professional career

Los Angeles Dodgers
McGough attended Plum High School in Plum, Pennsylvania and was drafted by the Pittsburgh Pirates in the 46th round of the 2008 Major League Baseball Draft, but did not sign. Instead, he chose to attend the University of Oregon, where he played for the baseball team. In the 2011 Major League Baseball Draft, he was drafted in the fifth round by the Los Angeles Dodgers.

McGough began his professional career in 2011 with the Rookie–level Ogden Raptors, and later earned a call-up to the Single-A Great Lakes Loons, pitching to a cumulative 2.77 ERA on the year. In 2012, he began the season with the High-A Rancho Cucamonga Quakes.

Miami Marlins

On July 25, 2012, McGough and Nathan Eovaldi were traded to the Miami Marlins in exchange for Hanley Ramírez and Randy Choate. He finished the year with the High-A Jupiter Hammerheads, recording a 2–1 record and 3.24 ERA in 15 appearances. In 2013, McGough split the season between the Double-A Jacksonville Suns and the Triple-A New Orleans Zephyrs, posting  a 4–4 record and 2.82 ERA with 59 strikeouts in 67.0 innings of work. In 2014, McGough underwent Tommy John surgery, and missed the 2014 season as a result. In 2015, McGough returned to action with Jupiter, Jacksonville, and New Orleans, accumulating a 1.93 ERA in 27 games for the three teams.

On August 20, 2015, McGough was selected to the 40-man roster and promoted to the major leagues for the first time. In his debut, McGough struggled, allowing three runs while only getting two outs against the Philadelphia Phillies. In his rookie season, he logged a 9.45 ERA across 6 appearances. On April 14, 2016, McGough was designated for assignment by Miami after struggling to a 13.50 ERA in 2 games with Triple-A New Orleans.

Baltimore Orioles
McGough was claimed off waivers by the Baltimore Orioles on April 15, 2016. On May 7, McGough was designated for assignment by the Orioles. He spent the season split between the Triple-A Norfolk Tides and the Double-A Bowie Baysox, posting a 2–3 record and 4.72 ERA in Norfolk and a 2–2 record and 5.68 ERA in Bowie. McGough split the 2017 season between Norfolk and Bowie as well, accumulating a 3–4 record and 2.75 ERA in 40 appearances between the two teams. He elected free agency on November 6, 2017.

Colorado Rockies
On November 23, 2017, McGough signed a minor league contract with the Colorado Rockies organization. He was assigned to AAA Albuquerque Isotopes for the 2018 season, where he pitched to a 7–3 record and 5.55 ERA in 43 games. He elected free agency on November 3, 2018, and re-signed with the team on a new minor league contract on November 9. McGough was later released on December 18, 2018.

Tokyo Yakult Swallows
On December 25, 2018, McGough signed with the Tokyo Yakult Swallows of Nippon Professional Baseball. In 2019, McGough pitched to a 6–3 record and 3.15 ERA with 11 saves in 65 games with the team. The next year, McGough pitched in 50 games for Tokyo, recording a 4–1 record and 3.91 ERA with 52 strikeouts in 46 innings pitched.

Arizona Diamondbacks
On December 15, 2022, McGough signed a two-year contract with the Arizona Diamondbacks.

International career
On July 2, 2021, McGough was named to the roster for the United States national baseball team for the 2020 Summer Olympics, contested in 2021 in Tokyo. The team went on to win silver, falling to Japan in the gold-medal game.

References

External links

Oregon Ducks bio

1989 births
Living people
Baseball players from Pittsburgh
Major League Baseball pitchers
Miami Marlins players
Oregon Ducks baseball players
Ogden Raptors players
Great Lakes Loons players
Rancho Cucamonga Quakes players
Jupiter Hammerheads players
Phoenix Desert Dogs players
Jacksonville Suns players
New Orleans Zephyrs players
Norfolk Tides players
Bowie Baysox players
Águilas de Mexicali players
American expatriate baseball players in Mexico
Albuquerque Isotopes players
Nippon Professional Baseball pitchers
Tokyo Yakult Swallows players
American expatriate baseball players in Japan
Baseball players at the 2020 Summer Olympics
United States national baseball team players
Olympic baseball players of the United States
Medalists at the 2020 Summer Olympics
Olympic silver medalists for the United States in baseball
Rochester Honkers players